Bakewell is a town and civil parish in Derbyshire, England, and the namesake of the Bakewell tart.

Bakewell may also refer to:

 Bakewell, Northern Territory, suburb of Palmerston, Australia
 Bakewell, Tennessee, U.S.
 Bakewell Island, Antarctica

People with the surname

In arts and media
Gary Bakewell, British television actor
Joan Bakewell (born 1933), British journalist and television presenter
Michael Bakewell, British television producer
Sarah Bakewell, British non-fiction writer
William Bakewell (1908–1993), also known as Billy Bakewell, American actor

In politics
Cathy Bakewell, Baroness Bakewell of Hardington Mandeville (born 1949), British politician
Charles Montague Bakewell (1867–1957), American professor and politician
Claude I. Bakewell (1912–1987), U.S. Representative from Missouri
Danny Bakewell (born 1946), American civil rights activist and entrepreneur
Edward Howard Bakewell (1859–1944), pastoralist and public transport official in South Australia
Ernest Bakewell (1898–1983), English-born chemical engineer and politician
Samuel Bakewell (1815–1888), grocer and politician in South Australia
William Bakewell (politician) (1817–1870), solicitor and politician in South Australia

In sport
Enid Bakewell (born 1940), English woman cricketeer
Fred Bakewell (1908–1983), English cricketer
George Bakewell (1864–1928), English footballer
Marika Bakewell (born 1985), Canadian curler
William Lincoln Bakewell (1888–1969), American sailor and adventurer

Others
Frederick Bakewell (1800–1869), English physicist
Robert Bakewell (disambiguation), a few people with the name

See also